SM U-46 was one of the 329 submarines serving in the Imperial German Navy in World War I. U-46 was engaged in the combat during World War I and took part in the First Battle of the Atlantic. After the war, she served in the Imperial Japanese Navy as O-2.

Imperial German Navy
Ordered on 4 August 1914, U-46 was constructed at the Kaiserliche Werft in Danzig, Germany. Launched on 18 May 1915, she was commissioned on 17 December 1915.

Assigned to the III Flotilla, U-46 began her first war patrol on 29 March 1916. Remaining in the III Flotilla for the rest of the war, she conducted a total of 11 war patrols before the war ended on 11 November 1918, and was credited with sinking 51 merchant ships totaling 138,942 gross register tons and one auxiliary warship of 1,372 gross register tons and damaging one merchant ship of 7,378 gross register tons.

After the end of the war, she surrendered to Japan on 26 November 1918.

Summary of raiding history

Imperial Japanese Navy

Transferred to Japan after surrendering, the submarine was commissioned into the Imperial Japanese Navy in 1920 as O-2. Decommissioned in 1921, she was partly dismantled at the Kure Naval Arsenal in April 1921.

A photo of U-46 apparently at the time of transfer to Japan shows the submarine docked and flying the flag of the Imperial Japanese Navy over the flag of the Imperial German Navy.

Some sources claim that O-2 was scrapped in 1922. Other sources claim that in 1925, O-2 was rebuilt at Yokosuka Naval Arsenal to serve as a testbed for submarine salvage operations by the submarine salvage ship Asahi and foundered in the Pacific Ocean in a storm off the coast of Japan during her transfer voyage from Yokosuka to Kure on 21 April 1925, adding that an American merchant ship sighted her derelict hulk floating in the Pacific west of Oahu, Hawaii, on 5 August 1927, and that the hulk subsequently was scuttled.

References

Notes

Citations

Bibliography

World War I submarines of Germany
1915 ships
Ships built in Danzig
U-boats commissioned in 1915
Foreign submarines of the Imperial Japanese Navy
Type U 43 submarines
Maritime incidents in 1925
Maritime incidents in 1927
Shipwrecks in the Pacific Ocean
Scuttled vessels